Thulli Vilayadu is a 2013 Tamil comedy thriller film written and directed by Vincent Selva and produced by D. Govindaraj. The film features newcomer Yuvaraj, Deepthi Nambiar, Soori, and Sendrayan in the lead roles. Prakash Raj and Jayaprakash play important roles with comic shades. Srikanth Deva has scored the music, while S. K. Boopathy has cranked the camera and V. T. Vijayan did the film's editing. The film released on 28 June 2013.

Plot
Raghu (Yuvaraj), Mano (Soori), and Thangavelu (Sendrayan) are faithful for politicians Singam (Prakash Raj) and Samipillai (Jayaprakash). Both politicians are fighting for 200 million rupees, which is meant to be used to bribe the people for the upcoming elections. in the meantime, the three men decide to jump in this and take it for their advantage. The men decide to go to Rajasthan to hide. On their trip, they meet a girl named Yamuna (Deepthi Nambiar), who is claimed to be Asin's younger sister. What is the next part of the chapter?

Cast
 Yuvaraj as Raghu
 Deepthi Nambiar as Yamuna
 Soori as Mano
 Sendrayan as Thangavelu
 Prakash Raj as Singam
 Jayaprakash as Samipillai
 Singamuthu
 Manobala
 Madhan Bob
 Sujatha
 Ankitha as an item number

Soundtrack
The soundtrack is composed by Srikanth Deva, collaborating with Vincent Selva for the fourth time. Director Mysskin, who earlier worked as an assistant director for Vincent Selva, had sung one of the songs. The audio was launched on 8 March 2013 by actor Vijay.

Release
The film was released on 28 June 2013 alongside Annakodi. The film took a poor opening and grossed only  in first week. The film opened with 78 shows on its first weekend in Chennai box office. It was removed after one week. It sold 3,800 tickets in Chennai during its lifetime.

Critical reception
The New Indian Express wrote:"lacklustre characters, insipid narration and shoddy screenplay make the film devoid of thrill, humour or excitement".

References

2013 films
2010s Tamil-language films
Films scored by Srikanth Deva